The Distinguished Service Cross (DSC) is a third-level military decoration awarded to officers; and, since 1993, ratings and other ranks of the British Armed Forces, Royal Fleet Auxiliary and the British Merchant Navy have been included. Additionally, the award was formerly awarded to members of other Commonwealth countries.

The DSC is "awarded in recognition of an act or acts of exemplary gallantry during active operations against the enemy at sea." Since 1979, it can be awarded posthumously.

History
The award was originally created in 1901 as the Conspicuous Service Cross, for award to warrant and subordinate officers, including midshipmen, ineligible for the Distinguished Service Order. It was renamed the Distinguished Service Cross in October 1914, eligibility being extended to all naval officers (commissioned and warrant) below the rank of lieutenant commander.

From March 1915, foreign officers of equivalent rank in allied navies could receive honorary awards; in August 1916, bars were introduced to reward further acts of gallantry meriting the Cross, with a silver rosette worn on the ribbon when worn alone, to denote the award of each bar. During World War I, officers of the Merchant and Fishing Fleets had been awarded the DSC, and their eligibility was legally clarified by an order in council in 1931.

World War II saw a number of changes. In December 1939, eligibility was extended to Naval Officers of the rank of Commander and Lieutenant-Commander. In April 1940, equivalent ranks in the Royal Air Force serving with the Fleet could receive the DSC, and, from November 1942, so could those in the Army aboard defensively equipped merchant ships.

Since the 1993 review of the honours system, as part of the drive to remove distinctions of rank in awards for bravery, the Distinguished Service Medal, formerly the third-level decoration for ratings, has been discontinued. The DSC now serves as the third-level award for gallantry at sea for all ranks, not to the standard required to receive the Victoria Cross or the Conspicuous Gallantry Cross.

The DSC had also been awarded by Commonwealth countries; however, by the 1990s, most of these—including Canada, Australia, and New Zealand—were establishing their own honours systems and no longer recommended British honours.

Recipients are entitled to the post-nominal "DSC".

Description
 The obverse has a circular centre containing the Royal Cypher of the reigning monarch at the time of award surmounted by a crown. 
 The reverse is plain apart from the hallmark, and the ribbon is attached via a hallmarked silver ring. From 1940, the year of issue was engraved on lower limb of cross, and since 1984 it has been awarded named to the recipient.
 The ribbon has three equal stripes of dark blue, white, and dark blue.
 The ribbon bar denoting a further award is plain silver, with convex ends and a central crown.

Recipients

Numbers awarded
Since 1901 at least 6,658 Crosses and 603 bars have been awarded. The dates below reflect the relevant London Gazette entries:

A number of honorary awards were made to members of allied foreign forces, including 151 for World War I, and 228 (with 12 first bars and 2 second bars) for World War II. Eight honorary awards were made in 1955 to members of the US Navy for service in Korea.

The above table includes awards to the Dominions:In all, 199 DSCs have gone to those serving with Canadian forces, with 34 first bars and five second bars. It was replaced in 1993 by the Medal of Military Valour.
182 were awarded to Australians, in addition to 13 first bars and three second bars. Last awarded to an Australian in 1972, it was replaced in 1991 by the Medal for Gallantry.

Four-time recipient
Only one person has ever been awarded the Distinguished Service Cross four times. Norman Eyre Morley served in the Royal Naval Reserve during World War I and World War II. He was awarded the DSC for the first time in 1919. He was awarded his second DSC in 1944. He was awarded the DSC a further two times in 1945. He gained an entry into the Guinness Book of Records as the most decorated reserve naval officer.

List of three-time recipients
Sir Robert Atkinson, served in the Royal Navy during World War II
Patrick Bayly, served in the Royal Navy and rose to the rank of vice admiral
Richard Gatehouse, served in the Royal Navy during World War II and later during the Korean War
George Onslow Graham, served in the Royal Navy and the Royal New Zealand Navy
Robert Peverell Hichens, served in the Royal Navy during World War II and was later recommended unsuccessfully for the Victoria Cross
Geoffrey John Kirkby, served in the Royal Navy during World War II. Awarded DSC in 1940, 1942 and 1944

Thomas Le Mesurier, served in the Royal Air Force during World War I as a flying ace credited with seven aerial victories. Awarded DSC twice in 1917 and in 1918
George James Macdonald, served in the Royal New Zealand Navy
Richard Minifie, served in the Royal Naval Air Service during World War I. Awarded DSC in twice in 1917 and in 1918
Stanley Orr, served in the Royal Navy during World War II. Awarded DSC in 1940, 1941, and 1944
Peter Piper, served in the Royal Naval Reserve during World War II. Awarded DSC in 1939 and twice in 1941
Jack Scatchard, served in the Royal Navy during World War II and the Cold War
Skule Storheill, served in the Royal Norwegian Navy and attached to the Royal Navy during World War II
Bob Whinney, served in the Royal Navy during World War II. Awarded DSC thrice in 1944

Collective award
In 1919, the Distinguished Service Cross was awarded to the City of Dunkirk for the gallant behaviour of its citizens during World War I, and the Cross appears in the coat of arms of the city.

See also
 Recipients of the Distinguished Service Cross
 British and Commonwealth orders and decorations

Notes and references

Bibliography 
 Current Royal Warrant for the Distinguished Service Cross, 17 September 2002. London Gazette.
 Abbott, Peter and Tamplin, John – British Gallantry Awards, 2nd edition (1981). Nimrod Dix and Co, London.
 Dorling, H. Taprell – Ribbons and Medals, (1956). A. H. Baldwin & Son
 Duckers, Peter – British Gallantry Awards 1855–2000, (2011). Shire Publications, Risborough, Buckinghamshire.
 Mussell, J (ed) – Medals Yearbook 2015, (2014). Token Publishing, Honiton, Devon.

Military awards and decorations of the United Kingdom